Aden is a port city in Yemen.

Aden may also refer to:

Places
 Aden Governorate, governorate of Yemen that includes the port city
 Aden, Alberta
 Aden Crater
 Aden, Illinois
 Aden, Virginia
 Aden Country Park, a park in Aberdeenshire, UK
 Aden Protectorate, former British protectorate
 Aden Province, former province of the British Raj
 Aden site, archaeological site
 Colony of Aden, successor to Aden Province
 Gulf of Aden
 State of Aden, successor to the Colony of Aden

Arts, entertainment, and media
 Aden (band), an American indie-pop band
 Hazel Aden, a fictional character in Degrassi: The Next Generation

Military
 Aden (battle honour), a British Army battle honour
 ADEN cannon, a British-made 30mm cannon used on military aircraft

Other uses
 Aden (company), a Southeast Asian e-commerce firm based in Bangkok, Thailand
 Aden (name), common Arabic and Somali name

See also
 Eden (disambiguation)
 Adan (disambiguation)